The European Inline Speed Skating Championships is the main inline speed skating championships in Europe, organized by European Confederation of Roller Skating.

Summary
Age Group: senior, junior A and junior B. 
junior A is for 18 and 19 year olds and Junior B is for 16 and 17 year olds.

Results
 :de:Inline-Speedskating-Europameisterschaften
 http://www.the-sports.org/inline-skating-european-junior-a-speed-championships-results-2018-epr84375.html
 http://www.the-sports.org/inline-skating-european-junior-b-speed-championships-results-2018-epr84376.html

External links
World Skate Europe Official website
Results

Inline speed skating competitions
European championships
1989 establishments in Europe
Recurring sporting events established in 1989